Castle Aviation is a cargo airline and private passenger airline based in North Canton, Ohio, United States. It operates charter cargo and private passenger services but specializes in priority freight. Its main base is Akron–Canton Airport.

History 
The airline was established and started operations in January 1986. In April 2004 it started operating the first freight version of the Saab 340A aircraft.

Fleet 
The Castle Aviation fleet consists of the following aircraft (as of October 2022):

Previously operated

Accidents
On December 10, 2021, Castle Air Flight 921, a Swearingen Merlin flying from Essex County Airport in New Jersey to Manchester–Boston Regional Airport crashed into a wooded area in Bedford, New Hampshire, on the banks of the Merrimack River, while on short final to runway 6. The pilot, who was the sole occupant, was killed upon impact.

References

External links
Castle Air

Cargo airlines of the United States
Airlines established in 1986
Airlines based in Ohio
1986 establishments in Ohio